The Garvin Cavaness House (now the Drew County Historical Museum) is a historic house at 404 South Main Street in Monticello, Arkansas. The house was built over a ten-year period, 1906–1916, by Garvin Cavaness, descendant of early settlers of Drew County. The -story building is built of concrete blocks that were custom-molded on site by Cavaness, reputedly using cement he recovered when hired to clean up spilled cement from derailed railroad cars.

Description and history 
The house Cavaness built has significant Classical Revival styling. Its main facade is dominated by a two-story portico supported by six concrete Ionic columns and topped by a relatively unadorned pediment. Granite steps lead up to the central bay, where the entry is flanked by sidelights and topped by a fanlight, all composed of bevel-edged leaded glass. The two outer bays of the front facade are set slightly back, and there are stairs descending from the porch down to the grounds at the ends. The building is capped by a hip roof made of tin shingles, whose front elevation is pierced by three gable dormers, the central one slightly larger than those flanking it. Each dormer has a round window above a line of small square windows. The side elevations are three bays, styled similarly to the front, including the portico, which wraps around on both sides. The back of the house has an asymmetrical L shape, where one bay has a two-story extension. The porch on this side has been screened, and partially enclosed by later alteration.

In the 1920s the house was divided into apartments, and some elements of its interior decoration were lost. The building was acquired by the Drew County Historical Society, which now uses the house and grounds as a museum facility. It was listed on the National Register of Historic Places on May 23, 1980.

See also
National Register of Historic Places listings in Drew County, Arkansas

References

External links
 Drew County Historical Museum - Facebook site

Houses on the National Register of Historic Places in Arkansas
Colonial Revival architecture in Arkansas
Neoclassical architecture in Arkansas
Houses completed in 1906
Museums in Drew County, Arkansas
Houses in Drew County, Arkansas
History museums in Arkansas
National Register of Historic Places in Drew County, Arkansas
1906 establishments in Arkansas